The FIL World Luge Championships 1989 took place in Winterberg, West Germany. The mixed team event consisting of two separate runs each in men's singles, two separate runs each in women's singles, and one run in men's doubles debuted.

Men's singles

Women's singles

Men's doubles

Mixed team

Medal table

References
Men's doubles World Champions
Men's singles World Champions
Mixed teams World Champions
Women's singles World Champions

FIL World Luge Championships
1989 in luge
1989 in German sport
Luge in Germany